The Federal Social Readaptation Center No. 1 "Altiplano" is a maximum security federal prison of the Secretariat of Public Security in Mexico. It was originally called the Penal de Máxima Seguridad No. 1 "Almoloya de Juárez", later renamed the Federal Social Readaptation Center No. 1 "La Palma" (Centro Federal de Readaptación Social No. 1 "La Palma"), before assuming its present name. This facility is located in the Santa Juana Centro neighborhood of Almoloya de Juárez, in the State of Mexico,  from Toluca.

The prison was built between 1988 and 1990 under President Carlos Salinas de Gortari and received its first inmates in November 1991. Of significant concern to Mexican authorities is the risk that the prison could be attacked from the outside as part of an organized prison break. Furthermore, the air space near the facility is restricted, and the authorities claim that cell phone transmissions are limited within  of the prison to stymie communications between the inmates and their colleagues outside. Additionally, armored personnel carriers are based near the facility to protect it during a potential assault. This prison was thought to be impenetrable until July 11, 2015, when Joaquín "El Chapo" Guzmán escaped through a tunnel.

Notable inmates 
 Miguel Ángel Félix Gallardo (known as "El Padrino" and "El Jefe De Jefes"): The founder of the modern Mexican drug trade, former leader and founder of the Guadalajara Cartel, one of the first Mexican cartels which was formed as an alliance of the Sinaloa Cartel, the Tijuana Cartel, and the Juarez Cartel. The cartel had connections to the Medellin Cartel and the Cali Cartel, and transported cocaine to the United States for them
 Rafael Caro Quintero (known as "El Narco de Narcos"): former drug lord of the Guadalajara Cartel
 Héctor Luis Palma Salazar (known as "El Güero"): former drug lord of the Sinaloa Cartel
 Joaquín "El Chapo" Guzmán: former drug lord of the Sinaloa Cartel, extradited to the United States on January 19, 2017
 Mario Aburto Martínez: accused assassin of presidential candidate Luis Donaldo Colosio
 Miguel Treviño Morales (known as "Z-40"): former leader of the Los Zetas Cartel, currently transferred to the Federal Center for Social Readaptation (Cefereso) No.17, located in Buenavista Tomatlán, in Tierra Caliente, Michoacán.
 Mario Ramírez Treviño (known as "El Pelón"): former deputy leader of the Gulf Cartel, extradited to the United States on December 18, 2017
 Eduardo Arellano Félix (known as "El Doctor"): former leader of the Tijuana Cartel
 Luis Fernando Sánchez Arellano (known as "El Ingeniero"): former deputy leader of the Tijuana Cartel
 Dionisio Loya Plancarte (known as "El Tío"): former leader of the Knights Templar Cartel
 Servando Gómez Martínez (known as "La Tuta"): former leader of the Knights Templar Cartel
 Omar Treviño Morales (known as "Z-42"): former deputy leader of the Los Zetas Cartel
 Abigael González Valencia (known as "El Cuini"): former deputy leader of the Jalisco New Generation Cartel
 José Maria Guizar Valencia (known as "Z-43"): former top lieutenant of the Los Zetas Cartel
 Ovidio Guzmán López (known as "El Ratón"): former high-ranking member of the Sinaloa Cartel
 José Antonio Yépez Ortiz (known as "El Marro"): former leader of the Santa Rosa de Lima Cartel
 Daniel Arizmendi López (known as "El Mochaorejas"): leader of Kidnapping express, a kidnapping gang
Various alleged members of the Los Zetas Cartel: Jaime González Durán (known as "El Hummer"), Nabor Vargas García (known as "El Débora") and "El Barbas"
 Teodoro García Simental (known as "El Teo"): drug lord who broke off from the Arellano Félix organization
Various alleged Zapatistas
 Marco Antonio García Simental (known as "El Cris" & "El 8-9"): lieutenant in the Arellano Félix organization and older brother of "El Teo".

In popular culture
The 2017 Netflix-Univision series, El Chapo, depicts Joaquín "El Chapo" Guzmán's incarceration and experience in the prison, and his escape through a tunnel on July 11, 2015, which disproved the assumption that the prison was impenetrable.

References

External links
 "CENTROS FEDERALES DE READAPTACIÓN SOCIAL." (Archive) Secretariat of Public Security.
 "Centro Federal de Readaptación Social N°1 "Altiplano"" COFEMER.  

Buildings and structures in the State of Mexico
Prisons in Mexico